Geart Aeilco Wumkes  or G.A. Wumkies (4 September 1869, Joure – 7 May 1954, Huizum) was a Protestant West Frisian language Bible translator, historian, and preacher of the Dutch Reformed Church.

Major work
His major work was the translation of the Bible into West Frisian, with the New Testament (West Frisian: Nije Testamint) being published in 1933 and the Old Testament (West Frisian: Alde Testamint) in 1943.  The Old Testament was completed with the help of E. B. Folkertsma. The complete Bible (West Frisian: Bibel) was published in 1943.

Other translations
In 1953 he translated John Bunyan's The Pilgrim's Progress into West Frisian: De Pylgerreize.

External links
Wumkes.nl mei ûnder oaren de Stads- en Dorpskroniek (West Frisian) 

Dutch Calvinist and Reformed theologians
People from Skarsterlân
Translators of the Bible into Frisian
1869 births
1954 deaths